Izumi-Chūō Station is the name of three train stations in Japan.

 Izumi-Chūō Station (Miyagi) (泉中央駅) in Sendai, Miyagi Prefecture
 Izumi-chūō Station (Kanagawa) (いずみ中央駅) in Yokohama, Kanagawa Prefecture
 Izumi-Chūō Station (Osaka) (和泉中央駅) in Izumi, Osaka Prefecture

See also
 Izumi Station (disambiguation)